The International Food Code (IFC) is a code which uniquely identifies foods from national food composition databases (FCDBs) around the world. It has also become popular among suppliers and manufacturers to uniquely identify their food products (see "Use on barcodes and numeric systems" below).

Structure of an IFC 

The IFC begins with a database identifier: An ISO 3166-1 alpha-2 code which identifies the source country, followed by a two digit code which represents the year of publication of the source database. A dot is usually used to separate the database identifier from the food code used by the publisher. The publisher's code can be up to 8 characters long, so the maximum length for an IFC is 12 characters, excluding the optional dot.

Examples

GB15.14-318 
The code above shows "Bananas, flesh only" from UK published "COFIDS Includes McCance & Widdowson 7th ed. 2015"

IE09.5068 
The code above shows "Porridge, made with low fat milk" from Irish published "Irish Food Composition database 2009"

US15.15083 
The code above shows "Fish, salmon, pink, raw" from US published "United States Department of Agriculture, SR28 2015"

Use on Barcodes and numeric systems 
A common variation on the IFC structure is to replace the leading ISO 3166-1 alpha-2 letters with their numeric equivalents. The publisher's code is then prefixed with leading zeros and the dot is excluded to create a 13 digit code. This allows the IFC to be used as a unique numeric code for UPC-A barcodes or other numeric systems.

Example:
GB15.14-318 becomes 8261500014318

Unique identifiers